The Silver Purchase Act may refer to one of two federal laws of the United States:

 The Sherman Silver Purchase Act of 1890
 The American Silver Purchase Act of 1934